Margaret Davis Jacob. b. Jan. 31, 1963) is an American historian. She is the Chancellor's Professor of History and Charles Mach Professor at the University of Nebraska–Lincoln.

Early life and education
Jacobs was born on January 31, 1963. She grew up in Colorado but also lived in California and Oregon. Jacobs completed her Bachelor of Arts degree in history at Stanford University in 1986 before enrolling at the University of California, Davis for her graduate degrees.

Career
Following her PhD, Jacobs taught history at New Mexico State University for seven years before joining the faculty at the University of Nebraska–Lincoln (UNL) in 2004. As a professor of history and the director of the Women's and Gender Studies Program, Jacobs published two book by 2009. Her first book was titled Engendered Encounters: Feminism and Pueblo Cultures, 1879-1934 and her second book was titled White Mother to a Dark Race: Settler Colonialism, Maternalism, and the Removal of Indigenous Children in the American West and Australia, 1880-1940. Her second book received one of three 2010 Bancroft Prizes and the 2011 Athearn Book Award. Two years later, Jacobs also received a fellowship from the American Council of Learned Societies to expand on her research from White Mother to a Dark Race. In 2015, Jacobs was appointed the Pitt Professor of American History and Institutions at the University of Cambridge for the 2015–16 academic year.

Throughout her tenure at UNL, Jacobs studied the removal of indigenous children from their families during the settlement of America’s West by white Europeans. In 2018, Jacobs became the first UNL professor to receive an Andrew Carnegie Fellowship. The following year, she was recognized for her research with an election to the American Academy of Arts and Sciences. Jacobs also received a three-year grant from the National Endowment for the Humanities to digitize, contextualize, and make available materials related to the Genoa Indian Industrial School. In 2021, Jacobs was named a Charles Mach Professor by the University of Nebraska, one of the highest forms of recognition bestowed upon faculty.

Works
Maternal Colonialism: White Women and Indigenous Child Removal in the American West and Australia, 1880–1940 
Engendered encounters: feminism and Pueblo cultures, 1879-1934 
White Mother to a Dark Race: Settler Colonialism, Maternalism, and the Removal of Indigenous Children in the American West and Australia, 1880-1940 
 A Generation Removed: The Fostering and Adoption of Indigenous Children in the Postwar World. Lincoln, NE: University of Nebraska Press, 2014.

References

External links

1963 births
Living people
21st-century American historians
Stanford University alumni
University of California, Davis alumni
University of Nebraska–Lincoln faculty
Akwesasne
American Mohawk people
American women historians
Native American writers
21st-century American women writers
Bancroft Prize winners
20th-century Native American women
20th-century Native Americans
21st-century Native American women
21st-century Native Americans
Native American academics
American women academics
Fellows of the American Academy of Arts and Sciences